Crataegus erythropoda is a hawthorn native to the southern Rocky Mountains in the United States. The leaves are conspicuously shiny above and fruit ("haws") are dark purplish red. It is seldom cultivated, but at one time was listed in the nursery trade under the common name "Chocolate Haw". It is closely related to C. rivularis which has fruit that are fully black when ripe.

Images

See also
 List of hawthorn species with black fruit

References

erythropoda
Flora of North America